Orfanidis is a surname. Notable people with the surname include:

 Lazaros Orfanidis (born 1995), Greek footballer
 Marios Orfanidis (born 1940), Cypriot footballer
 Petros Orfanidis (born 1996), Greek footballer

See also
 Georgios Orphanidis (1859–1942), Greek sports shooter
 Orphanides, surname

Greek-language surnames